Gojko Zec (15 September 1935 – 3 November 1995) was a Serbian football manager. He coached OFK Beograd, FK Partizan, FK Borac Banja Luka, NK Rijeka, Red Star Belgrade, Aris, Yugoslavia FK Borac Čačak.

He was murdered during an armed robbery on 3 November 1995 in Luanda, Angola. The case remains unsolved.

Managerial statistics

 *Dates of first and last games under Zec; not dates of official appointments

 *Dates of first and last games under Zec; not dates of official appointments

Honours

Manager
Red Star Belgrade
Yugoslav First League: 1976–77, 1983–84
Yugoslav Cup: 1985

Petro Atlético
Girabola: 1993, 1994
Taça de Angola: 1992, 1993, 1994
Supertaça de Angola: 1993, 1994

See also
List of unsolved murders

References

1935 births
1990s murders in Angola
1995 crimes in Angola
1995 deaths
1995 murders in Africa
Aris Thessaloniki F.C. managers
Deaths by strangulation
Expatriate football managers in Angola
FK Borac Banja Luka managers
FK Partizan managers
FK Vojvodina managers
HNK Rijeka managers
Male murder victims
OFK Beograd managers
People from Orahovica
People murdered in Angola
Red Star Belgrade managers
Serbs of Croatia
Serbian football managers
Serbian people murdered abroad
Unsolved murders in Angola
Yugoslav football managers